Pan American Airways (also known as Pan Am III) was a United States airline that operated scheduled services in the eastern US, as well as charters for tour operators and services to the Dominican Republic and to Puerto Rico.

History
The Pan Am brand was sold by the second incarnation of Pan American World Airways to New Hampshire-based Guilford Transportation Industries, a railroad company headed by Timothy Mellon.

After this transaction, a new airline was established on June 29, 1998. Guilford launched Pan American Airways with a fleet of seven Boeing 727-200s.  This airline was nicknamed by some as Pan Am III. The third incarnation began scheduled operations on October 7, 1999, and flew to nine cities in New England, Florida, the Canadian Maritimes and Puerto Rico. The focus was on secondary airports such as Orlando Sanford International Airport, Pease International Airport and Worcester Regional Airport.

The new owners relocated the company headquarters from Fort Lauderdale to Portsmouth in December 1998.

Pan American later had cooperative service arrangements with Boston-Maine Airways, a feeder subsidiary incorporated by the airline in March 1999. Pan American also established in 2003 a subsidiary PAWA Dominicana, operating under a joint venture with Boston-Maine Airways.

Guilford ceased operating Pan Am on November 1, 2004, and its operations were transferred to Boston-Maine Airways.

Fleet

Pan Am operated a fleet of 7 Boeing 727-200s. These aircraft were the following: 
N342PA (Clipper Guilford), 
N343PA ("Bahamas Clipper"), 
N346PA ("Clipper Lady Thatcher"), 
N348PA ("Clipper Ed Ball"), 
N349PA ("Clipper Juan Trippe"), 
N361PA ("Clipper A. Jay Cristol")
N362PA (Also known as "Clipper Lady Thatcher"/"Clipper Omagh").

See also
Pan American Airways (1996–1998)
List of defunct airlines of the United States

References

Pan Am
Defunct airlines of the United States
Airlines established in 1998
Re-established companies
Companies based in Portsmouth, New Hampshire
Airlines disestablished in 2004
Defunct companies based in New Hampshire